Leda Díaz (born 28 October 1946) is a Honduran long-distance runner. She competed in the women's marathon at the 1984 Summer Olympics.

References

1946 births
Living people
Athletes (track and field) at the 1984 Summer Olympics
Honduran female long-distance runners
Honduran female marathon runners
Olympic athletes of Honduras
Place of birth missing (living people)